Tergu is a comune (municipality) in the Province of Sassari in the Italian region Sardinia, located about  north of Cagliari and about  northeast of Sassari in the Anglona historical regiona.

It is home to the Romanesque church of Nostra Signora di Tergu.

References

Cities and towns in Sardinia
1980 establishments in Italy
States and territories established in 1980